is a passenger railway station located in the city of Rittō,  Shiga Prefecture, Japan, operated by the West Japan Railway Company (JR West).

Lines

Station layout
The station consists of two opposed side platforms connected by an elevated concourse. The station is staffed.

Platforms

History
Rittō Station was opened on 16 March 1991.

Station numbering was introduced to the station in March 2018 with Rittō being assigned station number JR-A23.

Passenger statistics
In fiscal 2019, the station was used by an average of 11,976 passengers daily (boarding passengers only).

Surrounding area
Daiho Shrine
Ritto City Daiho Elementary School
Ritto Arts and Culture Center Sakira
 Sekisui Chemical Shiga Ritto Factory

See also
List of railway stations in Japan

References

External links

JR West official home page

Railway stations in Japan opened in 1991
Tōkaidō Main Line
Railway stations in Shiga Prefecture
Rittō, Shiga